Bierkowo  (German Birkow) is a village in the administrative district of Gmina Słupsk, within Słupsk County, Pomeranian Voivodeship, in northern Poland. 

The village has a population of 921 in 2008.

In 2010, INFO-FM-TV built a 124 metres tall broadcasting tower at Bierkowo.

References

Bierkowo